Events from the year 1889 in Canada.

Incumbents

Crown 
 Monarch – Victoria

Federal government 
 Governor General – Frederick Stanley 
 Prime Minister – John A. Macdonald
 Chief Justice – William Johnstone Ritchie (New Brunswick)
 Parliament – 6th

Provincial governments

Lieutenant governors 
Lieutenant Governor of British Columbia – Hugh Nelson  
Lieutenant Governor of Manitoba – John Christian Schultz 
Lieutenant Governor of New Brunswick – Samuel Leonard Tilley  
Lieutenant Governor of Nova Scotia – Archibald McLelan   
Lieutenant Governor of Ontario – Alexander Campbell  
Lieutenant Governor of Prince Edward Island – A.A. Macdonald (until September 2) then Jedediah Slason Carvell 
Lieutenant Governor of Quebec – Auguste-Réal Angers

Premiers    
Premier of British Columbia – Alexander Edmund Batson Davie (until August 1) then John Robson (from August 2)
Premier of Manitoba – Thomas Greenway 
Premier of New Brunswick – Andrew George Blair  
Premier of Nova Scotia – William Stevens Fielding  
Premier of Ontario – Oliver Mowat    
Premier of Prince Edward Island – William Wilfred Sullivan (until November 1) then Neil McLeod 
Premier of Quebec – Honoré Mercier

Territorial governments

Lieutenant governors 
 Lieutenant Governor of Keewatin – John Christian Schultz
 Lieutenant Governor of the North-West Territories – Joseph Royal

Premiers 
 Chairman of the Lieutenant-Governor's Advisory Council of the North-West Territories – Robert Brett

Events

August 1 – Alexander Davie, Premier of British Columbia, dies in office.
August 2 – John Robson becomes premier of British Columbia.
August 12 – The Canada (Ontario Boundary) Act, 1889 of the British Parliament expands Ontario's boundaries west to the Lake of the Woods and north to the Albany River.
September 19 – A rockslide in Quebec City kills 45
November – Neil McLeod becomes premier of Prince Edward Island, replacing Sir William Wilfred Sullivan.
November 6 – Newfoundland election: William Whiteway's Liberals win a majority, defeating Robert Thorburn's Reforms

Full date unknown
The Dominion Women Enfranchisement Association is created to campaign for women's right to vote

Births
February 27 – Samuel Bronfman, businessman (d.1971)
May 16 – Morris Gray, politician (d.1966)
August 13 – Camillien Houde, politician and four-time mayor of Montreal (d.1958)
October 13 – Douglass Dumbrille, actor (d.1974)
November 20 – John B. McNair, lawyer, politician, judge and 22nd Lieutenant Governor of New Brunswick (d.1968)
December 4 – Leslie Gordon Bell, politician and lawyer (d.1963)

Deaths
April 9 – Andrew Charles Elliott, jurist, politician and 4th Premier of British Columbia (b. c1828)
May 4 – A. B. Rogers, surveyor (b.1829)
June 5 – John Hamilton Gray, Premier of New Brunswick (b.1814)
July 5 – John Norquay, politician and 5th Premier of Manitoba (b.1841)
August 1 – Alexander Edmund Batson Davie, politician and 7th Premier of British Columbia (b.1847)
September 5 – Louis-Victor Sicotte, lawyer, judge and politician (b.1812)
September 13 – Henry Joseph Clarke, lawyer, politician and 3rd Premier of Manitoba (b.1833)
October 28 – Alexander Morris, politician, Minister and 2nd Lieutenant Governor of Manitoba (b.1826)

Full date unknown
Edwin Randolph Oakes, politician (b.1818)

Historical documents
Archbishop Taché cites education report from England to support Manitoba separate schools

Report on repatriating French Canadians living in New England

Table: Of 7 U.S. cities with more than 10,000 Canadian-born residents (including Newfoundlanders), 4 are in New England, mostly in 3 industrial towns

Table: In all 6 New England states, whites with both parents born in "Canada (French)" far outnumber those with parents born in "Canada (English)"

"A thrill of horror pulsed through the whole city last night" - Rockslide from cliff below Citadel destroys several Quebec City houses

Canada should be equal to Britain in Empire, and under "Queen of Canada"

John A. Macdonald on missed opportunity to create Kingdom of Canada with "gradation of classes"

Methodist minister's brief description of Stoneys concentrates on their problems

Nova Scotia orphanage holds housewarming

Ad for "Aphroditine[...]Sold on positive guarantee to cure any form of nervous disease, or any disorder of the generative organs"

References 

 
Years of the 19th century in Canada
Canada
1889 in North America